Primula chionantha, the snow-white primrose, is a species of flowering plant in the family Primulaceae, native to Tibet, Sichuan and Yunnan in China. It has gained the Royal Horticultural Society's Award of Garden Merit.

Subtaxa
The following subspecies are accepted:
Primula chionantha subsp. brevicula (Balf.f. & Forrest) A.J.Richards – Yunnan
Primula chionantha subsp. chionantha
Primula chionantha subsp. melanops (W.W.Sm. & Kingdon-Ward) A.J.Richards – Sichuan

References

chionantha
Endemic flora of China
Flora of South-Central China
Flora of Tibet
Plants described in 1915